The 2011–12 season was the 110th season of competitive football in Italy.

Promotions and relegations (pre-season)
Teams promoted to Serie A
 Siena
 Atalanta
 Novara

Teams relegated from Serie A
 Sampdoria
 Brescia
 Bari

Teams promoted to Serie B
 Gubbio
 Nocerina
 Hellas Verona
 Juve Stabia

Teams relegated from Serie B
 Piacenza
 Triestina
 Portogruaro
 Frosinone

Honours

Trophy and league Champions

Promotion winners

Playoff winners

Italy national football team

Euro 2012 qualification

Friendlies

League tables

Serie A

Serie B

Clubs in international competitions

Milan

UEFA Champions League

Group stage

Knockout phase

Internazionale

UEFA Champions League

Group stage

Knockout phase

Napoli

UEFA Champions League

Group stage

Knockout phase

Udinese

UEFA Champions League

Play-off round

UEFA Europa League

Group stage

Knockout phase

Lazio

UEFA Europa League

Play-off round

Group stage

Knockout stage

Roma

UEFA Europa League

Play-off round

Slovan Bratislava won 2–1 on aggregate.

Palermo

UEFA Europa League

Third qualifying round

References

 
Seasons in Italian football
2011 in Italian sport
2011 in association football
2012 in Italian sport
2012 in association football